Shuvatara School is a comprehensive school that serves about 900 students in first through tenth grade from Nepal, in Lalitpur, Nepal.

Notable alumni
 Anmol KC - Actor
Evana Manandhar - Miss Nepal 2015
 Paramita RL Rana; Actress, Model

References

Schools in Nepal
Secondary schools in Nepal
Lalitpur District, Nepal
Educational institutions established in 1989
1989 establishments in Nepal